Came is a surname, and may refer to:

 Charles Greene Came (1826–1879), American lawyer, newspaper editor, and politician
 Kenneth Came (1925–1986), British Army officer and cricketer
 Mark Came (born 1961), English footballer
 Richard Adolphus Came (1847–1917), English architect
 Shaun Came (born 1983), English footballer